Olelbis (meaning "he who is above") is the creator deity in Wintun mythology. The antagonist of Olelbis is Sedit.

Account
According to the mythology of the Wintum tribe, Olelbis desired that the members of the human race should live together as brothers and sisters; that there should be no birth and no death, that life should be agreeable and easy, and the purpose of life should be to rejoining Olelbis in heaven and live with him for all eternity. To satisfy the hunger of the human body, Olelbis created a species of nut which has no shell and falls off the tree when it is ripe (this species of nut or fruit is still a staple item of the Wintum's diet). Olelbis ordered two brothers to build a paved road from earth to heaven to facilitate the tribe's reunion with their Creator. But Sedit appeared on the scene and persuaded one of the brothers that it would be better to engage in sexual intercourse and procreate the human species. The one persuaded by Sedit argued the other into agreement, so both defected from Olelbis and joined together to destroy the road they were building to heaven. Sedit, horrified when he finds he has brought death to the human race and must die himself, tries to escape his fate. He makes himself a mechanism of boughs and leaves (a plane), by means of which he hopes to fly to heaven. But he crashes and is killed. Olelbis looks down from the heights of heaven and says, "See. The first death! From henceforth (all) men shall die."

References

Gods of the indigenous peoples of North America
Creator gods
Wintun